ICBP may refer to:

 International Centre for Birds of Prey
 International Consortium of British Pensioners, a lobby group for frozen state pensions
 International Council for Bird Preservation, now BirdLife International